Mangaldoi Assembly constituency is one of the 126 assembly constituencies of Assam Legislative Assembly. Mangaldoi forms part of the Mangaldoi Lok Sabha constituency.This seat is reserved for the Scheduled Castes (SC).

Members of Legislative Assembly 
 1951: Purandar Sarma, Indian National Congress
 1957: Dandi Ram Dutta, Indian National Congress
 1962: Dandi Ram Dutta, Indian National Congress
 1967: Md. Matlibuddin, Independent
 1972: Syed Anwara Taimur, Indian National Congress
 1978: Anil Das, Janata Party
 1983: Kartik Sarkar, Indian National Congress
 1985: Nilamoni Das, Independent
 1991: Nakul Chandra Das, Indian National Congress
 1996: Hiren Kumar Das, Asom Gana Parishad
 2001: Basanta Das, Indian National Congress
 2006: Hiren Kumar Das, Asom Gana Parishad
 2011: Basanta Das, Indian National Congress
 2016: Gurujyoti Das, Bharatiya Janata Party
 2021: Basanta Das, Indian National Congress

Election results

2016 results

2011 result

References

External links 
 

Assembly constituencies of Assam